Brighter Day may refer to:

 Brighter Day (album), a 2005 studio album by Troy Cassar-Daley
 "Brighter Day" (song), a 2014 song by Namie Amuro

See also
 The Brighter Day, an American daytime soap opera which aired from 1954 to 1962
 Brighter Days (disambiguation)